The Salanga massacre is commemorated annually  in Bangladesh in memory of an event in which several hundred protesters were killed, on 27 January 1922, when fired on by British Indian police.  Bengali independence activist Abdur Rashid Tarkabagish, then 21, was leading a non-violent protest at the Salanga bazaar in Raiganj Upazila in what was then the Bengal province of British India.  The area is now within the Sirajganj District of Bangladesh.  

Interest in the event, not well documented, was revived with the rediscovery in the late 20th century of "a rarely found account of Abdur Rashid titled 'Shadhinota Shangramer Rakta Shiri Salanga (Salanga: The Blood Stained-Step to the Struggle for Independence)"   which stated that thousands of people died and that the bodies were thrown into the Bangali river or buried in a mass grave. 

According to one researcher, relying on local literature at the Maulana Abdur Rashid Tarkabagish Memorial Library in the area, the number of deaths ranged from 1,500 to 4,500 people.    A mass graveyard remains near Salanga Bazar at Rahmatganj  and 27 January is annually observed in the Sirajganj District as Salanga Day, the centennial of which was on 27 January 2022.

References

Massacres in 1922
Massacres in British India
Bengal Presidency
Sirajganj District
1922 in British India
Massacres committed by the United Kingdom
Protests in British India